Carrcroft is an unincorporated community in New Castle County, Delaware, United States. Carrcroft is located along Delaware Route 3, north of the interchange with Interstate 95 to the northeast of Wilmington. Stoney Creek runs along its eastern edge and creates its border with Green Acres.

History
Carrcroft was once known as New Ark Union. The Newark Union Burial Ground is nearby.

Carrcroft's population was 25 in 1890. and was 87 in 1960.

References

External links

Unincorporated communities in New Castle County, Delaware
Unincorporated communities in Delaware